The Priory, Pebworth (Broad Marston Priory) is a listed building in the village of Pebworth, in Worcestershire, England.

References

Monasteries in Worcestershire